Penallt (also spelt Penalt) is a village in Monmouthshire, Wales, set high on a hill  south of Monmouth. In the centre of the village, by the village green, is the 17th-century village pub, the Bush Inn.

Description
Nearby, the Penallt Old Church Wood is a  nature reserve managed by the Gwent Wildlife Trust. This deciduous woodland forms a habitat for several bird species, including pied flycatchers, nuthatches, tree pipits, treecreeperss and sparrowhawks. Plant species include wild daffodils and moschatel.

Penallt Old Church is about a mile north of the village. The main part of the building dates from the 15th or early 16th century, while the lower part of the tower may date from the 14th century. The heavy oak door bears the date 1532. The church was restored in 1887. The churchyard cross has a base and lower shaft of 15th-century date. The church dedication is unknown, though there is a local tradition that it was St James, the patron saint of pilgrims. Inside is the royal coat of arms of Queen Anne dating from 1709.

The Argoed, a 17th-century mansion, lies to the south-east of the village. It was once owned by the father of Beatrice Webb, the British socialist, economist and reformer. Robert Plant of Led Zeppelin owned it in the 1980s. George Bernard Shaw stayed with the Webb family and described Penallt as a "special place"
Other residents of the village include Jeremy Cook, the BBC's rural affairs correspondent, and the television presenter Kate Humble. Walter Keeler is a renowned potter specialising in salt glaze pottery.

Gallery

References

External links 

 
 Genuki on Penallt
 Gwent Wildlife Trust's Pentwyn Farm, Penallt orchard
 Photos of Penallt Old Church, at geograph.org.uk

Villages in Monmouthshire